"Just Lovin' You" is a song written and recorded by American country music duo The O'Kanes.  It was released in October 1987 as the fourth single from the album The O'Kanes.  The song reached number 5 on the Billboard Hot Country Singles & Tracks chart.

Chart performance

References

1987 singles
1986 songs
The O'Kanes songs
Songs written by Kieran Kane
Songs written by Jamie O'Hara (singer)
Columbia Records singles